Joseph Herbert Tritton (a.k.a. J. Herbert Tritton) (1844–1923) was an English banker.

Early life 
Joseph Herbert Tritton was born on 5 September 1844 at Olney Lodge, in Battersea, then in Surrey (now London). His father, Joseph Tritton (1819–1887), was a Quaker banker. His mother was Amelia Hanson, the daughter of Joseph Hanson of Brixton.

He was educated at Windlesham House School and Rugby School. He then went to work for the bank Barclay, Bevan, Tritton & Co., where his father was a partner. After some time he chose to make a trip abroad instead of going to university.

Career 
After working for only five years, Tritton became a partner in Barclay, Bevan, Tritton & Co. When it became known as Barclays Bank, he served on its board of directors, retiring as a director in 1918.

Tritton was a co-founder of the Institute of Bankers and served as its President twice. The institute worked in educating bankers, and in standardizing their way of working. Tritton also served on the Council of Foreign Bondholders and was the honorary secretary of the London Clearing Bankers. 

Tritton was involved in founding the London Chamber of Commerce in 1882. He also became its president.

Tritton served as the Chairman of the Indo-European Telegraph Company (now Siemens Communications). 

Triton was also chairman of the General Steam Navigation Company (GSN). He was elected at age 30 in 1874, with little experience of the shipping business. He began his chairmanship with bold moves to double the company's capital, and to modernize its fleet. His chairmanship ended with his forced resignation after the company had come close to financial collapse in 1892. However respected Tritton might later become as a banker, at least with regard to GSN, he failed as an entrepreneur. On the other hand, his successor Richard White was a successful entrepreneur. In Tritton's obituary, his chairmanship of GSN was not mentioned.

Philanthropy
Tritton was elected as a Fellow of the Royal Society of Arts in 1890. He was a recipient of the Order of the Lion and the Sun.

Religious life
Tritton was a devout Christian and a speaker at the biggest international Protestant conference to date in London, 1888. He spoke of Paul's the apostle's words whose conviction led him to say that he was a man indebted to the world (Romans 1:14:"I am obligated both to Greeks and non-Greeks, both to the wise and the foolish"). Likewise, so Tritton, Christians ought approach ministry and missions with the same attitude and use commerce as a means of propagating Christ-like values. Commerce and Missions are to cooperate and pay off the debt of love to the world.

Personal life
On 17 June 1867, he married Lucy Jane Smith, the daughter of Henry Abel Smith (1826–1890) of Wilford, Nottingham, a banker with interests in Lincoln and Nottingham. They had five sons and four daughters.
 Herbert Leslie Melville Tritton (1870–1940), married Gertrude Susan Gosset
 Alan George Tritton (1882–1914), Captain, 3rd Bn, Coldstream Guards, died in World War I

Family history
J. Herbert Tritton's family history Tritton: the Place and the Family (with an elaborate pedigree) was published in 1907. Then book contains some entertaining correspondence.

Death
Tritton died at his home, Lyons Hall, in Great Leighs, Essex on 11 September 1923.

References

Citations

Bibliography
 
 
 
 
 
 

1844 births
1923 deaths
English bankers
British corporate directors
Barclays people
Joseph Herbert
People from Battersea
People educated at Rugby School
People from Great Leighs
People educated at Windlesham House School